Horace Astley (born 1882) was an English footballer who played for Crystal Palace as a forward.

Career
Born in Bolton, Astley played professionally for Middlesbrough, before following manager Jack Robson South to join the newly established club, Crystal Palace. Astley was the top scorer in the club's second season, 1906–07, the club's first playing in the Southern League Division One. Astley famously scored the only goal in Palace's shock defeat of Newcastle in the first round of the 1906–07 FA Cup.

References

1882 births
English footballers
Middlesbrough F.C. players
Crystal Palace F.C. players
English Football League players
Southern Football League players
Year of death missing
Heywood United F.C. players
Association football forwards